Olga Anatolyevna Gorshenina (born 9 November 1990) is a Russian handballer for CSKA Moscow and the Russian national team.

International honours
EHF Cup:
Winner: 2012, 2014

References

External links

1990 births
Living people
Sportspeople from Tolyatti
Russian female handball players
Expatriate handball players
Russian expatriate sportspeople in Hungary